Anthony Frank Knights (13 March 1940 – 16 August 2001) was an English professional footballer who played as a wing half.

References

1940 births
2001 deaths
Footballers from Grimsby
English footballers
Association football wing halves
Grimsby Town F.C. players
Luton Town F.C. players
Aldershot F.C. players
Gainsborough Trinity F.C. players
English Football League players